Twentieth Century Communism is a bi-annual peer-reviewed academic journal for "an international forum for the latest research" focusing on the "Russian revolution (1917–1991) and on the activities of communist parties themselves" but extending to antecedents, rivals (including political groups and nation states), and cultural and political influences. Its editors are Gavin Bowd, Gidon Cohen, Ben Harker, Dianne Kirby, Norman LaPorte, Kevin Morgan, and Matthew Worley.

See also

 American Communist History journal (US)
 Communisme journal (France)

References

External links

History of the United States journals
Biannual journals
Leninism
Political science journals
Area studies journals
English-language journals
Publications with year of establishment missing